Cats FM is a private FM radio station airing from Jalan Bako, Kuching, Sarawak, Malaysia. The radio covers areas of Sarawak and Brunei. The radio airs in Malay and Iban. The station used to air programmes in English and Mandarin Chinese.

Cats FM is Sarawak's first private radio station.

Special programs

Pantun Sarawak (Bermukun) 
It is announced in February 2011 that Cats FM will re-air the traditional Pantun Sarawak after an absence of two years. The Pantun Sarawak also known as bermukun or berpantun is a Sarawakian art, not only confined to the Malays but also to other ethnics as well. The program airs every Friday from 9.30pm-11pm, with presenters Cassie and Wan KAK.

CATS Exposed 
CATS Exposed is a segment that features Sarawakian acts that aired since 2008. Interested acts may send the radio their demos and the radio then will air their songs. Also, on Sundays (11 a.m) there is a chart program that features these local acts.

Anugerah Juara Rentak Ruai (AJARR) 
Ajarr is an annual song competition organised by Cats FM since 2008. The competition is equivalent to Anugerah Juara Lagu organised by TV3.
List of past winners of Best Song of AJARR are as following;

19th anniversary celebration
On 7 August 2015, the station celebrated its 19th anniversary by airing a 19-hour marathon. The marathon highlighted Cats FM achievements and how much it has grown since 1996. The program aired from 5 pm on 7 August and ended at noon on 8 August 2015.

Kumang Gawai pageant
In 2017, Cats FM organised its inaugural CATS Kumang Gawai Darlie 2017 beauty pageant in collaboration with Darlie. The pageant is held in conjunction with Gawai Dayak celebration.

Frequencies 
 99.3 MHz (Kuching & Kota Samarahan)
 88.7 MHz (Sri Aman & Betong)
 88.4 MHz (Sibu)
 99.9 MHz (Selangau)
 93.3 MHz (Miri)
 88.3 MHz (Bintulu)
 88.7 MHz (Limbang)
 97.9 MHz (Mukah)
 96.7 MHz (Sarikei)
 88.2 MHz (Lawas)
 107.6 MHz (Kapit)
 99.5 MHz (Belaga)
 88.2 MHz (Sipitang & Sindumin, Sabah)

Online

Mobile
Cats FM app is also available on Google Play and Apple App Store.

References

External links 
 

1996 establishments in Malaysia
Radio stations established in 1996
Radio stations in Malaysia
Mass media in Kuching